Death Valley  is a 1982 American slasher film starring Paul Le Mat, Catherine Hicks, Stephen McHattie, Wilford Brimley, Peter Billingsley and Edward Herrmann.
It was directed by Dick Richards and written by Richard Rothstein.
It centered on a divorcee and her child being stalked by a serial killer after the boy picks up an object that can help tie the killer to his crimes.

Plot 
Paul Stanton has talked his son Billy into being sent to California to join his mother, Sally, and her old high school sweetheart (and current new boyfriend) Mike who are going into Arizona. Passing through Death Valley, they discover it is the new territory of a cowboy serial killer (who wearing a hat and a neckerchief to hide his identity) and his equally demented twin. Both have just done away with a teenage couple at an abandoned gold mine. Billy, stretching his legs, stumbles across their camper. Somehow overlooking the carnage, he comes across a frog pendant, which he steals. Its owner returns to find his trinket gone and pursues.

Cast

Home media 
On December 11, 2012, Shout! Factory released a retail Blu-ray/DVD combo pack of the film.

References

External links
 
 
 
 
 

1982 films
1982 horror films
1980s American films
1980s English-language films
1980s serial killer films
1980s slasher films
American serial killer films
American slasher films
Films directed by Dick Richards
Films produced by Elliott Kastner
Films set in California
Universal Pictures films